Lieutenant General Gösta Lilliehöök (19 September 1871 – 22 November 1952) was a Swedish Army officer. His senior commands include commanding officer of the 1st Infantry Brigade, military commander of Upper Norrland and of the Eastern Army Division as well as Commandant General of Stockholm Garrison.

Early life
Lilliehöök was born on 19 September 1871 in Ovansjö, Gävleborg County, Sweden, the son of major Gustaf "Gösta" Lilliehöök and his wife Gunilla Wærn. He was the brother of colonel Bertil Lilliehöök (1870–1967) and lieutenant general Lennart Lilliehöök (1872–1950).

Career

Military career
He was commissioned as an officer in Hälsinge Regiment in 1891 with the rank of underlöjtnant. Lilliehöök transferred to Svea Life Guards in 1892 where he was promoted to lieutenant in 1896. He became captain in the General Staff in 1904 and in the Svea Life Guards in 1905 and in the Norrbotten Regiment in 1909. He was a teacher of tactics at the Royal Swedish Army Staff College from 1905 to 1910 and acting chief of staff at the military commander on Gotland from 1906 to 1909. In 1909, Lilliehöök conducted military studies in Germany. He became major in the General Staff in 1912 and served as senior adjutant and lieutenant colonel in the General Staff in 1915 and as staff officer in the Infantry Inspectorate (Infanteriinspektionen) the same year.

In 1915, Lilliehöök was appointed head of the Royal Swedish Army Staff College and two years later, in 1917, he was promoted to colonel in the General Staff and appointed regimental commander of the Jämtland Ranger Regiment. From April to May 1917, Lilliehöök conducted military studies at the Carpathian Front in Austria. In 1921, Lilliehöök joined the Norwegian Army and in 1928 he was promoted to major general in the Swedish Army and appointed military commander of Upper Norrland's Troops. He conducted military studies in Finland in 1929 and in 1930 he was appointed commanding officer of the Eastern Army Division (Östra arméfördelningen) and Commandant General of Stockholm Garrison. In 1934 he was promoted to lieutenant general and he conducted military studies in Northern Norway in 1935. Lilliehöök retired in 1936. Four years later, Lilliehöök again served as Commandant General of Stockholm Garrison but only for a few months, from April to December 1940.

Other work
As a young officer, Lilliehöök was already interested in the military skiing, Lilliehöök became one of the pioneers of this branch of training and was one of the foremost Swedish authorities in the field of winter field service. He also promoted the voluntary shooting movement and was chairman of the central board of the Rifle Association of Sweden (Sveriges skytteförbunds överstyrelse) from 1934 to 1943. He was chairman of the Jämtland County Ski Runner Association (Jämtlands läns skidlöpareförbund) from 1918 to 1928, and of the Swedish Lapland Mountain Men's Club (De lappländska fjällkarlarnas klubb) from 1929 to 1945 and in the Swedish Mountaineering Club (Svenska fjällklubben) from 1938 to 1944. In 1931 he became King in Council's delegate in the central board of the Swedish Sports Confederation. In AB Tipstjänst, he was King in Council's representative from the beginning of the company's operations from 1934 to 1941 and chairman of its working committee from 1934 to 1943.

Lilliehöök was also chairman of Sagokonst AB, AB Industricentralen and the Svenska draghundklubben.

Personal life
Lilliehöök married for the first time on 24 September 1901 in Hedvig Eleonora Parish, Stockholm, to Gerda Eva Anna Helena Gabriella Hansson (13 September 1872 in Stockholm – 12 May 1927 in Östersund), the daughter of the wholesaler Lars Peter Hansson and Sofia Josefina Lagercrantz. They had three children, Sigrid (born 1900), Gösta G:son (born 1903) and Gunilla (born 1907).

He married for the second time on 18 July 1929 in Misterhult, Kalmar County, to Irma Maria Pagel (12 October 1894 in Stockholm – 29 September 1972 in Stockholm), the daughter of the wholesaler Axel Julius Pettersson Pagel and Alida Maria Edberg. They had one son, Axel G:son (born 1930).

Death

Lilliehöök died on 22 November 1952 in Bromma Parish, Stockholm. In the mid-1950s, his remains were transferred to Nikkaluokta Chapel in Nikkaluokta where he was buried. The chapel where Lilliehöök is buried next to, was built as an initiative of the Swedish Lapland Mountain Men's Club (De lappländska fjällkarlarnas klubb), of which Lilliehöök was a long-time chairman.

Dates of rank
1891 – Underlöjtnant
1896 – Lieutenant
1904 – Captain
1912 – Major
1915 – Lieutenant colonel
1917 – Colonel
1928 – Major general
1934 – Lieutenant general

Awards and decorations
Lilliehöök's awards:

Swedish
   Commander Grand Cross of the Order of the Sword
   Knight of the Order of the Polar Star
   Knight of the Order of Vasa
  Shooting Gold Medal
  Shooting Plaque
  Landstormens Silver Medal (LandstSM)
  Swedish Military Sports Association's gold medal (Sveriges militära idrottsförbunds guldmedalj)
  CfifGM
  Swedish Gymnastic and Sports Clubs' Association's gold medal (Svenska gymnastik- och idrottsföreningarnas riksförbunds guldmedalj)
  Jämtland County Rifle Association's gold medal (Jämtlands läns skytteförbunds guldmedalj)
  Iron Medal of the Association for Ski Promotion (Skidfrämjandets järnmedalj)

Foreign
   Commander First Class of the Order of the White Rose of Finland
   Commander Second Class of the Order of St. Olav
   Officer of the Legion of Honour
   Grand Commander of the Order of the Dannebrog
   Commander Grand Cross of the Order of Polonia Restituta
   Commander Grand Cross of the Order of the Crown
  Danish Sports Gold Medal (Dansk idrottsguldmedalj)

Honours
Member of the Royal Swedish Academy of War Sciences (1914)

Filmography
I gult och blått (1942)
Talarfilm Gösta Lilliehöök och Sixtus Jansson (1940)

References

External links

Article at Svenskt biografiskt lexikon

1871 births
1952 deaths
Swedish Army lieutenant generals
People from Sandviken Municipality
Members of the Royal Swedish Academy of War Sciences
Swedish sports executives and administrators
Commanders Grand Cross of the Order of the Sword
Knights of the Order of the Polar Star
Knights of the Order of Vasa